The Blackpool United Hebrew Congregation was an Ashkenazi Orthodox Jewish community that met in a Grade II listed building  in Leamington Road, Blackpool, England.

History
The Blackpool United Hebrew Congregation was founded in about 1907 with the merger of Blackpool Hebrew Congregation which had been founded in 1898 and Blackpool New Orthodox Hebrew Congregation (founded in 1905). The synagogue was originally located in Springfield Road, North Shore. The synagogue in Leamington Road was consecrated in 1916.

It was a provincial synagogue under the aegis of the Chief Rabbi of the United Kingdom.

The synagogue building, designed by Blackpool alderman and justice of the peace R B Mather in the Byzantine architectural style, is Grade II listed It was built between 1916 and 1926 and was later altered in 1955 and 1976.

On 8 February 2009, the synagogue hosted a visit by Jonathan Sacks, the Chief Rabbi of the United Hebrew Congregations of the United Kingdom. The visit was arranged by Eric Moonman, the president of the Zionist Federation of Great Britain and Ireland.

The synagogue closed in May 2012, as the community numbers had fallen below a viable congregation. The last service, conducted by Cantor Steven Robins LRCM, was held on 13 May 2012 accompanied by the Shabbaton Choir. The synagogue was packed for the occasion with many former members and children and grandchildren of congregants from previous years attending.   The sermon was given by Rabbi Arnold Saunders of Manchester, a previous Minister.

The last Minister of the synagogue was Rabbi David Braunold who assumed the pulpit in 1985 and departed for the St Anne's Hebrew Congregation in 2010. Rabbi Braunold gave the welcoming address at the last service.

There is a legacy site for the synagogue.

See also
 Blackpool Reform Jewish Congregation
 List of Jewish communities in the United Kingdom
 List of synagogues in the United Kingdom

References

External links
Blackpool United Hebrew Congregation at GENUKI
Blackpool United Hebrew Congregation on Jewish Communities and Records - UK (hosted by jewishgen.org).

1907 establishments in England
2012 disestablishments in England
Ashkenazi Jewish culture in England
Ashkenazi synagogues
Byzantine Revival architecture in the United Kingdom
Byzantine Revival synagogues
Grade II listed buildings in Lancashire
Grade II listed religious buildings and structures
Judaism in England
Orthodox synagogues in England
Religion in Lancashire
Synagogues in Blackpool